Robert Edward Allen (April 1, 1924 – November 22, 2014) was an American lawyer and legislator in Colorado.

Born in New York City, Allen was a lawyer and was the executor director for the city of Denver War on Poverty in 1965 and then was an assistant public defender in 1969. Allen was a Democrat. Allen served in the Colorado House of Representatives from 1951 to 1960 and then in the Colorado State Senate from 1961 to 1964. He was majority leader of the House of Representatives from 1959 to 1960.

Notes

1924 births
2014 deaths
Politicians from New York City
Politicians from Denver
Colorado lawyers
Democratic Party Colorado state senators
Democratic Party members of the Colorado House of Representatives
Public defenders
20th-century American lawyers